José Nucete Sardi (August 4, 1897 – November 12, 1972) was a Venezuelan historian, journalist and diplomat. He was born in Mérida and died in Caracas. He was married to Julia Salas Ruiz, daughter of the illustrious intellectual Julio Cesar Salas, with whom he had four daughters.

Education
He attended high school and college in the city of Mérida at the Universidad de Los Andes (ULA), graduating with a Philosophy and Arts specialty in 1914. Later he studied at the Universities of Geneva (Switzerland) and Brussels (Belgium) and attended free courses at the University of Columbia (USA) where he also taught Latin American literature.

Journalism career
Nucete Sardi did considerable work as a journalist, starting as editor of the newspaper El Universal between 1922 and 1936. He was also director of El Relator in 1927 and later director of the National Culture Magazine from 1940 to 1944, and the political-literary weekly magazine - Diagonal. He was a contributor to El Nacional from its founding in 1943, as well as on its Literary Paper. He also worked on Cultura Universitaria (University Culture) from Elite magazine and many other periodicals. He received numerous awards and literary prizes.

Political and diplomatic career
Nucete Sardi's career as a public servant includes:
Director of the National Press Office (1936–1937),
Secretary of the Venezuelan Delegation to the League of Nations (1937–1938),
Inspector General of Consulates (1937–1938),
First secretary of the Venezuelan delegation in Germany, Czechoslovakia, Poland and Romania (1938–1940),
Director of Culture and Fine Arts of the Ministry of Education (1940–1944),
Ambassador of Venezuela to the Soviet Union (1946),
Ambassador to Argentina (1958–59).
Two-time ambassador to Cuba (1947 to 1948 and 1959-1961),
Companion Ambassador to the Quintero Cardinal, Archbishop of Caracas responsible for the inauguration of its Cardenalicia headquarters (1961),
Governor of the State of Mérida (1964–1966),
Ambassador to Belgium and Luxembourg (1966–1967).

Nucete Sardi was also elected deputy to the Constituent Assembly of 1945 by the state of Mérida and remained closely linked to democratization and progressive movement in his native Venezuela between 1936 and 1945. He later fought against the dictatorship of Marco Pérez Jiménez, being one of the signatories to the Manifiesto de los Intelectuales (the Intellectuals' Manifesto), which outlined strategies on the road to overthrow the dictator. For his opposition to dictatorship and democratic struggle he suffered persecution and later went into exile.

As Venezuela's ambassador to Cuba, Nucete Sardi broke relations with the dictatorship of Fulgencio Batista after President Carlos Prío Socarrás was ousted. Relations were restored after the triumph of the Cuban Revolution led by Fidel Castro, when Nucete Sardi was again sent as Ambassador to Havana. Relations were again broken as a result of violations of sovereignty by the Castro regime in Venezuela with the invasion of Machurucuto, in an effort by Fidel Castro to expand communist guerrillas on the continent.

In his diplomatic work in Europe during and after World War II he was a defender of the rights of the Jewish people and later in promoting the creation of the State of Israel. Nucete Sardi was the first President of the Committee for a Hebrew Palestine in Venezuela, and spearheaded efforts to promote the same across Latin America. In 1947, at the United Nations assembly vote to create the State of Israel, Venezuela’s Ambassador Carlos Eduardo Stolk Mendoza, was accompanied by a High Level Delegation which included former founding members of the above mentioned Venezuelan Committee, such as then Venezuela’s Minister of Foreign Affairs Andres Eloy Blanco and  Ambassador Nucete Sardi, then posted in Cuba.

Academic, writing and history career
He taught at the university level. Among the academic and cultural positions he had to perform were:
Secretary General and Vice - President of the Ateneo de Caracas, during various periods (1940–1967),
President of the Association of Venezuelan writers (1944–1945),
Founding member of the National Academy of History from August 4, 1946.
Librarian for the Academy (1947),
Chairman of the Committee on the origins of the Emancipation of the American Institute of Geography and History, based in Mexico.

He authored the following works:
Aspecto del Movimiento Federal Venezolano - (Aspects of the Venezuelan Federal Movement),
Aventura y Tragedia de Don Francisco de Miranda - (Adventure and Tragedy of Don Francisco de Miranda),
La casa natal del Libertador - Birthplace of the Liberator),
Cecilio Acosta y José Martí - (Cecilio Acosta y José Marti),
Binomio de Espíritus - (Binomial of Spirits),
 La Ciudad y sus Tiempos - (The City and its time),
Cuadernos de Indagación e Impolíticas - (Journal of inquiry and impolitics),
 La Defensa de Caín - (the Defense of Cain),
El Escritor y Civilizador Simón Bolívar - (The Writer and Civilizer Simón Bolívar),
 EL Hombre de Allá Lejos -(The Man from afar),
Huellas en América - (Footprints in America),
Navidades del Libertador - (Liberator's Christmas),
Nieves, Gente y Brumas - (Snow, People and mists),
Notas sobre la Pintura y la Escultura en Venezuela - (Notes on Painting and Sculpture in Venezuela).

He translated the 5th volume of the Ministry of Education's 1942 edition of Viaje a las regiones equinocciales del Nuevo Continente(Travel to the Equinoctial Regions of the New Continent), by Alexander von Humboldt into Castilian. He also translated El Bosquejo de Caracas (The Outline of Caracas) by Robert Semple (1964) and several original texts on the Miranda expedition of 1806.

He was also the author of biographies of heroes in the Venezuelan Jackson Encyclopedia (Buenos Aires, 1956) and in the Biographical Dictionary of Venezuela, edited by Garrido, Mosque and Co. (1953).

As a lecturer he promoted a vast amount of work on the history and literature of Venezuela throughout New York City, Paris, Brussels, Buenos Aires, Rio de Janeiro, Havana, Tel-Aviv, La Plata and London.

Recognition
His native state of Mérida recognized him with one of the busts in the Plaza de los Escritores (Writers' Square), the José Nucete Sardi Parish in the Alberto Adriani Municipality  and the José Nucete Sardi Lyceum in the city of Tovar.

References 

1897 births
1972 deaths
20th-century Venezuelan historians
Venezuelan journalists
Venezuelan diplomats
Ambassadors of Venezuela to the Soviet Union
Ambassadors of Venezuela to Cuba
Ambassadors of Venezuela to Belgium
Ambassadors of Venezuela to Luxembourg
20th-century journalists